Ambler station is a SEPTA Regional Rail station in Ambler, Pennsylvania. It was originally built by the Reading Company as Wissahickon, until being renamed in 1869 after Mary Johnson Ambler, who helped direct the aftermath of the Great Train Wreck of 1856. The station serves the Lansdale/Doylestown Line. Its official address is at Butler Avenue and Main Street; however, the actual location is a block west on Butler Avenue and Short Race Street. The station provides connections to SEPTA Bus Routes 94 and 95. In FY 2017, Ambler station had a weekday average of 1,138 boardings and 881 alightings.<ref>{{cite web|url=http://www.septa.org/reports/pdf/asp15.pdf |title=SEPTA (May 2014). Fiscal Year 2015 Annual Service Plan." p. 61 |url-status=dead |archiveurl=https://web.archive.org/web/20140812142611/http://www.septa.org/reports/pdf/asp15.pdf |archivedate=August 12, 2014 }}  </ref>  The station includes a 496-space parking lot.

The station was briefly featured in the 1966 Hayley Mills movie The Trouble with Angels'', although subsequent station scenes were shot at the Glendale Transportation Center in California.

Station layout
Ambler has two high-level side platforms.

References

External links

SEPTA – Ambler Station 
 Station from Butler Avenue from Google Maps Street View

SEPTA Regional Rail stations
Former Reading Company stations
Railway stations in Montgomery County, Pennsylvania
Stations on the SEPTA Main Line
Railway stations in the United States opened in 1855
1855 establishments in Pennsylvania